The ravine hocicudo (Oxymycterus wayku) is a rodent species from South America. It is found in Argentina.

References

Oxymycterus
Mammals described in 2008